John Kirk (20 November 1890 – 25 March 1951) was a British cyclist. He competed in two events at the 1912 Summer Olympics.

References

External links
 

1890 births
1951 deaths
English male cyclists
Olympic cyclists of Great Britain
Cyclists at the 1912 Summer Olympics
Sportspeople from Kingston upon Hull
Cyclists from Yorkshire